Pavel Marinov (born June 12, 1988) is a Bulgarian professional basketball small forward who currently plays for Yambol in the Bulgarian NBL. He is also the captain of the Bulgarian national team.

External links

References

http://yambolbasketball.com/players/players2007-08/player-pmarinov08.php

1988 births
Living people
Bulgarian men's basketball players
BC Yambol players
BC Balkan Botevgrad players
Small forwards
Basketball players from Sofia